Kevin Robinson (December 19, 1971 – December 9, 2017) nicknamed K-Rob was a professional freestyle BMX rider. Widely recognized as one of the best riders of all time, Robinson was integral in creating Megaramp disciplines for BMX. Aside from this, Robinson was most notable for two stunts in his career: He was the first to successfully land a Double Flair (double backflip with 180 degree horizontal rotation) in competition at the 2006 X Games and, in 2016, set the Guinness World record for the highest air on a BMX bike (27 feet) in his home town of East Providence, Rhode Island. Robinson was a longtime receiver of sponsorship from Hoffman Bikes, Red Bull, and Target. Robinson died of a stroke, ten days shy of his 46th birthday, on December 9, 2017.

Video Game Appearances
Kevin Robinson was featured in Mat Hoffman's Pro BMX for the PlayStation and Mat Hoffman's Pro BMX 2 for the Xbox (console), PlayStation 2, Game Boy Advance and the GameCube. To promote the second game, Kevin as well as the other pro BMX riders featured went on a tour with 90 minutes of footage being used in the game.

References

1971 births
2017 deaths
BMX riders
American male cyclists
X Games athletes
People from East Providence, Rhode Island
Sportspeople from Providence County, Rhode Island
Cyclists from Rhode Island